John Peter Steinbrink, Sr. (born April 17, 1949) is an American politician and was a Democratic Party member of the Wisconsin State Assembly, representing the southeastern part of Kenosha County for eight terms, from 1997 until 2013.  He has been President of the Pleasant Prairie Village Board since 1995.

Biography
Born in Kenosha, Wisconsin, Steinbrink graduated from George Nelson Tremper High School. He then went to Carthage College and University of Wisconsin–Madison Farm and Industry short course. He was a dairy and grain farmer. He has served continuously on the Pleasant Prairie, Wisconsin board since 1985, bridging the 1989 transition from Town to Village.

He was elected to the Assembly in the 65th Assembly District in 1996, defeating popular Republican Jeff Toboyek from the City of Kenosha.  He was re-elected seven times in the 65th District.

However, in 2011 the new Republican majority used their power to redraw the state's legislative maps, and Steinbrink was one of eleven Democrats who were drawn out of their old districts entirely.  Pleasant Prairie was separated from neighboring Kenosha and gerrymandered into a district with distant rural communities of western Kenosha County.  Steinbrink was forced to run against incumbent Republican Samantha Kerkman in the 61st District and lost by ten points.

References

External links
 
 Follow the Money – John Steinbrink
2008 2006 2004 2002 2000 1998 campaign contributions
Campaign 2008 campaign contributions at Wisconsin Democracy Campaign

1949 births
Living people
Politicians from Kenosha, Wisconsin
Carthage College alumni
University of Wisconsin–Madison alumni
21st-century American politicians
People from Pleasant Prairie, Wisconsin
Democratic Party members of the Wisconsin State Assembly